Isaiah Guzylak-Messam (born March 10, 1995) is a professional Canadian football defensive back for the BC Lions of the Canadian Football League (CFL).

University career
Guzylak-Messam played U Sports football with the Wilfrid Laurier Golden Hawks from 2014 to 2017. He played in 24 games where he had 82 total tackles and two interceptions.

Professional career
Guzylak-Messam was drafted in the fourth round, 34th overall, in the 2018 CFL Draft by the BC Lions. He signed with the team on May 14, 2018, and initially began the season on the practice roster before making his professional debut on August 25, 2018. He played in ten regular season games in his rookie year where he had eight special teams tackles. In 2019, he became a starting linebacker midway through the year where he played in all 18 regular season games and made 11 starts where he had 37 defensive tackles, 14 special teams tackles, and one sack.

Guzylak-Messam did not play in 2020 due to the cancellation of the 2020 CFL season. He then signed a contract extension with the Lions on February 1, 2021. He returned to a reserve role in 2021 where he played in 12 out of 14 regular season games and had two special teams tackles.

References

External links
BC Lions bio

1995 births
Living people
BC Lions players
Canadian football defensive backs
Wilfrid Laurier Golden Hawks football players
Sportspeople from Hamilton, Ontario
Players of Canadian football from Ontario